Félix Javier Pérez Rivera (May 31, 1971 – September 21, 2005) was a Puerto Rican professional basketball player. In 15 seasons in the Baloncesto Superior Nacional (BSN), Pérez played for the Mets de Guaynabo, Atléticos de San Germán, Piratas de Quebradillas, Leones de Ponce, and Capitanes de Arecibo. In 1995, he led the league in rebounds with an average of 10.3 per game.

Pérez was a member of the Puerto Rican national basketball team.  As part of the national team, he participated in the 1994 Goodwill Games where Puerto Rico won the gold medal, and the 1994 FIBA World Championship.

Pérez was killed on September 21, 2005 outside his home in Guaynabo, Puerto Rico, when he tried to help his neighbor during a robbery. He had a wife, Sara Aponte, and four children.

In 2010, Glorimari Jaime Rodríguez, mayor of Pérez's hometown Guayama, announced that the basketball stadium of Cimarrona would be renamed in his honor.

Statistics

|-
| align="left" | 1990
| align="left" | Guaynabo
| 6 || .500 || .000 || .250 || 1.5 || 0.2 || 2.0
|-
| align="left" | 1991
| align="left" | Guaynabo
| 14 || .333 || .000 || 1.000 || 1.6 || 0.1 || 1.3
|-
| align="left" | 1992
| align="left" | Guaynabo
| 33 || .556 || .000 || .475 || 9.7 || 0.8 || 8.7
|-
| align="left" | 1993
| align="left" | Guaynabo
| 30 || .488 || .286 || .442 || 3.3 || 1.0 || 7.7
|-
| align="left" | 1994
| align="left" | Guaynabo
| 30 || .532 || .000 || .450 || 8.8 || 0.9 || 9.8
|-
| align="left" | 1995
| align="left" | Guaynabo
| 30 || .602 || .316 || .491 || 10.3 || 1.7 || 12.7
|-
| align="left" | 1996
| align="left" | Guaynabo
| 34 || .551 || .125 || .362 || 6.9 || 1.1 || 7.3
|-
| align="left" | 1997
| align="left" | Guaynabo
| 25 || .622 || .000 || .520 || 4.7 || 0.9 || 9.6
|-
| align="left" | 1998
| align="left" | San Germán
| 31 || .597 || .000 || .545 || 7.0 || 1.3 || 5.7
|-
| align="left" | 1999
| align="left" | San Germán
| 18 || .620 || .000 || .556 || 6.2 || 1.1 || 5.7
|-
| align="left" | 2000
| align="left" | Quebradillas
| 23 || .556 || .000 || .667 || 3.7 || 0.7 || 3.6
|-
| align="left" | 2001
| align="left" | Quebradillas
| 22 || .640 || .000 || .565 || 9.8 || 1.3 || 7.9
|-
| align="left" | 2002
| align="left" | Arecibo
| 28 || .548 || .000 || .355 || 7.9 || 1.6 || 6.5
|-
| align="left" | 2003
| align="left" | Ponce
| 24 || .616 || .000 || .556 || 5.1 || 0.8 || 4.2
|-
| align="left" | 2003
| align="left" | Arecibo
| 6 || .286 || .000 || .455 || 8.7 || 0.7 || 4.2
|-
| align="left" | 2004
| align="left" | Arecibo
| 27 || .515 || .500 || .615 || 3.6 || 0.9 || 2.9
|-
| align="left" | Career
| align="left" |
| 381 || .560 || .213 || .480 || 6.9 || 1.0 || 6.9

References

External links 
 Baloncesto Superior Nacional website

1971 births
2005 deaths
Atléticos de San Germán players
Deaths by firearm in Puerto Rico
Leones de Ponce basketball players
Male murder victims
People from Guayama, Puerto Rico
People murdered in Puerto Rico
Piratas de Quebradillas players
Puerto Rican men's basketball players
Basketball players at the 1995 Pan American Games
Pan American Games competitors for Puerto Rico
Puerto Rican murder victims
2002 FIBA World Championship players
2005 murders in Puerto Rico
Centers (basketball)
Goodwill Games medalists in basketball
Competitors at the 1994 Goodwill Games
1994 FIBA World Championship players